Switch is the tenth album by Dutch rock band Golden Earring, released in 1975.

Track listing

All songs written by Hay and Kooymans except where noted.

"Intro: Plus Minus Absurdio" – 3:08
"Love Is a Rodeo" – 3:37
"The Switch" – 5:27
"Kill Me (Ce Soir)" (John Fenton, Hay, Kooymans) – 6:22
"Tons of Time" – 4:20
"Daddy's Gonna Save My Soul" – 4:15
"Troubles and Hassles" – 4:20
"Lonesome D.J." – 4:36

Personnel
 George Kooymans - guitar, vocals
 Rinus Gerritsen - bass, keyboards
 Barry Hay - flute, vocals
 Cesar Zuiderwijk - drums
 Robert Jan Stips - keyboard
Additional personnel
 Bertus Borgers - saxophone
 Eelco Gelling - guitar

Production
Producer: Golden Earring
Executive producer: Fred Haayen
Engineer: Andy Knight, John Kriek, Jan Schuurman
Mixing: Andy Knight, John Kriek
Arranger: Golden Earring
String arrangements: Robert Jan Stips
Art direction: George Osaki
Concept: Barry Hay
Photography: Paul Gerritsma, Graham Hughes

Charts

Trivia
Kill Me (Ce Soir) was covered by Iron Maiden as a B side on their 1990 single "Holy Smoke"

On the Dutch pressing, MCA-2139, that was marketed in Europe, the Side 2 label has the song lists double printed.  A slight offset is very noticeable.  It is unknown how many of these 'double prints' were sold before the manufacturer caught the error.

References

Golden Earring albums
1975 albums
Polydor Records albums